Short Heath is a residential area situated north of the market town of Willenhall, in the Metropolitan Borough of Walsall, West Midlands, England. Short Heath is a ward in the Walsall North constituency, and is bordered by the neighbouring walls  of Bentley and Darlaston North, Birchills Leamore, Willenhall North, and Willenhall South.

The population of the ward is approximately 11,374, according to a mid-2018 ward-level population estimate published by the ONS.

The area contains housing developments, several schools, and a number of businesses and shops.

Short Heath also contains Rough Wood - a small woodland area, and Bentley Haye - an area of wet grassland, both forming part of the larger Rough Wood Chase Local Nature Reserve.

History 
The area's history consists, as is the case in much of the surrounding area, of collieries and mining.

Transport

Public transport 
Short Heath is served by several bus routes operated by both National Express West Midlands and Diamond West Midlands. These routes connect Short Heath to nearby town centres and areas such as Willenhall, Walsall, and Bloxwich.

The nearest train stations to Short Heath are Bloxwich (BLX), Bloxwich North (BWN), and Walsall (WSL). Operated by West Midlands Trains (previously London Midland).

Road infrastructure 
Short Heath is well connected to the main road network, such as the A462 which runs through the middle of the area, from the Willenhall South to Willenhall North.

The M6 motorway runs along the eastern edge of the Short Heath boundary, with Junction 10 being approximately 0.7 miles away.

References

Areas of the West Midlands (county)
Willenhall